Loch Kirkaig is a small tidal sea loch, located in the region and parish of Assynt in south-west of Sutherland, in the west coast of Scotland and in the Scottish Highlands. Loch Kirkaig is 1.25 miles south of Loch Inver. The scattered crofting township of Inverkirkaig is located at the headland of the bay, next to the pebbly beach, on the round bay, which has no known name. The name Kirgaig comes from old Norse, Kirkju-vik meaning church bay, perhaps suggesting that in Viking times, there was a church, with a village located in the bay.

Settlements
Inverkirkaig lies at the head of the sea loch, surrounding a small sand and pebble beach. The principal settlement in the area is the village of Lochinver in Assynt, which is located 2 km northwest of the beach, along the unnamed coast road.

Geography
Loch Kirkaig is bounded by Kirkaig point in the north, and Ribha na Brèige point.

Loch Kirkaig is fed by the River Kirkaig, which drains the lochs of Fionn Loch, Loch Veyatie, Cam Loch Loch á Chapuil, and indirectly Loch nan Ràc, Loch Borralan and Loch Urigill. Travelling in a southeasterly direction along the River Kirkaig through a wooded glen, is the natural wonder and tourist attraction, the 20m Falls of Kirkaig.

The small island of Sgeir Mhòr is located close to the southern coast of the bay.

Gallery

See also
 List of lochs in Scotland
 List of reservoirs and dams in the United Kingdom

References

Kirkaig
Kirkaig